Carmenta anthracipennis, the liatris borer moth, is a moth of the family Sesiidae. It was described by Jean Baptiste Boisduval in 1875, and is known from the United States, including Florida, Texas, Massachusetts and Illinois.

The larvae bore through the stems of Liatris species.

References

External links
mothphotographersgroup

Sesiidae
Moths described in 1875